Adam Day is an American poet and critic. He is the author of Left-Handed Wolf (Louisiana State University Press, 2020), Model of a City in Civil War (Sarabande Books, 2015), and one chapbook of poetry, Badger, Apocrypha (Poetry Society of America, 2011). He is also editor of the anthology, Divine Orphans of the Poetic Project (1913 Press).

Life and work
Day was born and raised primarily in Louisville's working class south end. He graduated from Eckerd College (2001), and from New York University (2004) with an MFA in creative writing.

Day publishes Action, Spectacle, an online and print journal of art and culture, which is guest-edited by a changing lineup of writers and artists.

He has taught English and creative writing at Earlham College, New York University, Bellarmine University, the University of Houston, the University of Kentucky, and elsewhere.

In 2011, Day was selected by David Lehman for the PEN Emerging Writers Award. Lehman wrote, "Day is unafraid to conjoin historical and fictional personages for effects that startle and provoke, as in Combine, in which Stalin, Goya, Queen Anne, and Tennessee Williams are among the cast of characters. Impressive, too, is the poem in which Day juxtaposes excerpts 'From an Interview with Kenzaburō Ōe, with Stage Directions from Synge's Riders to the Sea.' This poet's technical prowess, adventurousness, and wide-ranging curiosity give pleasure now and the promise of a great deal more to come."

Honors and awards
 Al Smith Fellowship from the Kentucky Arts Council
 PEN Emerging Writers Award 
 Poetry Society of America Chapbook Fellowship for Badger, Apocrypha

Collections of poetry
 Left-Handed Wolf (forthcoming, Louisiana State University Press, 2020),
 Model of a City in Civil War. Sarabande Books, 2015. ;  
 Badger, Apocrypha. Poetry Society of America, 2010.

References

Poets from Kentucky
Living people
New York University alumni
Writers from Louisville, Kentucky
1977 births
21st-century American poets
Eckerd College alumni